King Cinder is a six-part British children's television serial made by the BBC in 1977. It was first shown between 2 November and 7 December 1977 on BBC1.

A gritty series, King Cinder by John Foster, pitches two teenagers, played by Peter Duncan (Kerry) a speedway bike rider and Lesley Manville (Nicky) his girlfriend against a criminal gang running an extortion racket run by nasty Todd Edwards (Michael Hawkins) and Hells Angel Daniel Abineri in a South Coast fictional seaside town called Barton. The series concludes with a climatic ending where Edwards driving a red Austin Maxi chases a running Kerry through a quarry only to see Edwards crash over a cliff.

The executive producer was Anna Home.

Cast

Kerry Hutson – Peter Duncan
Nikki – Lesley Manville
Todd Edwards – Michael Hawkins
Richard Hutson – Tony Caunter
Trevor Hutson - Jeremy Arnold
Lacey – Daniel Abineri

References

External links
 

1977 British television series debuts
1970s British children's television series
BBC children's television shows
1977 British television series endings
Television series about teenagers